Santa Anna Independent School District is a public school district based in Santa Anna, Texas.

The district has two campuses – Santa Anna Secondary (Grades 7–12) and Santa Anna Elementary (Grades PK–6).

Academic achievement
In 2009, the school district was rated "academically acceptable" by the Texas Education Agency.

Athletics
Santa Anna High School plays six-man football.

See also

List of school districts in Texas

References

External links
Santa Anna ISD

School districts in Coleman County, Texas